She Paints Words in Red is the sixth studio album by English indie rock band The House of Love. It was released in April 2013 under Cherry Red Records.

Track listing

Personnel
The House of Love
Guy Chadwick - vocals, guitar
Terry Bickers - guitar, vocals
Matt Jury - bass
Peter Evans - drums
Technical
Julian Tardo - engineer
Andy Smith - cover layout
Suzie  Gibbons - photography

References

2013 albums
The House of Love albums
Cherry Red Records albums